Edith Linwood Bush (September 15, 1882 – November 3, 1977) was an American mathematician. She was the high school mathematics teacher of her younger brother, Vannevar Bush, before becoming dean of the Jackson College for Women at Tufts University and the first woman to teach engineering at Tufts.

Life
Bush was born on September 15, 1882 in Everett, Massachusetts, one of three children of Universalist minister R. Perry Bush and his wife, née Emma Linwood Paine. She grew up in Chelsea, Massachusetts, and graduated from Tufts University in 1903 as a member of Chi Omega and Phi Beta Kappa. She became the head mathematics teacher at Chelsea High School from 1906 to 1918, becoming the mathematics teacher of her younger brother, Vannevar Bush. She briefly became principal of Provincetown High School before returning to Tufts in 1920, where she became a mathematics instructor.

In 1922, she became an assistant professor at Tufts, the first female faculty member to teach in the School of Engineering. She was named dean of the Jackson College for Women in 1925, and in the same year became a full professor. She retired in 1952, and was succeeded as dean by biologist Katherine Jeffers.

On her retirement she returned to Provincetown, Massachusetts, where she lived in a house built by her grandfather, Captain Lysander N. Paine. She died on November 3, 1977 in Waltham, Massachusetts.

Recognition
Tufts University gave Bush an honorary doctorate in 1942. In 1959, a new student residence at Tufts was named Bush Hall in her honor. It was originally an undergraduate women's dormitory, but by 1991 was occupied only by graduate students. After major renovation in 1995, it again became an undergraduate dormitory.

References

1882 births
1977 deaths
People from Everett, Massachusetts
20th-century American mathematicians
American women mathematicians
Tufts University alumni
Tufts University faculty
20th-century American women